Trivellona syzygia is a species of small sea snail, a marine gastropod mollusk in the family Triviidae, the false cowries or trivias.

Description
The length of the shell attains 10.7 mm.

Distribution
This marine species occurs off the Philippines and New Caledonia.

References

 Dolin, L. (2001). Les Triviidae (Mollusca: Caenogastropoda) de l'Indo-Pacifique: Révision des genres Trivia, Dolichupis et Trivellona = Indo-Pacific Triviidae (Mollusca: Caenogastropoda): Revision of Trivia, Dolichupis and Trivellona. in: Bouchet, P. et al. (Ed.) Tropical deep-sea benthos. Mémoires du Muséum national d'Histoire naturelle. Série A, Zoologie. 185: 201-241. 
 Fehse D. & Grego J. (2004) Contribution to the knowledge of the Triviidae (Mollusca: Gastropoda). IX. Revision of the genus Trivellona. Berlin and Banska Bystrica. Pubished as a CD in 2004; as a book in 2009. 

Triviidae
Gastropods described in 2001